Lucidus may refer to:
Ananas lucidus, a plant species related to the pineapple
Asymphorodes lucidus, a species of moth
Chlorostilbon lucidus or glittering-bellied emerald, a bird species
Chrysococcyx lucidus or shining bronze cuckoo
Conus lucidus, a sea snail species
Cotoneaster lucidus, a shrub species
Cyanerpes lucidus or shining honeycreeper, a bird species
Hemiculter lucidus or Ussuri sharpbelly, a freshwater fish species
Hemignathus lucidus or Nukupu‘u, a bird species
Hyalurgus lucidus, a species of fly
Ligustrum lucidum or Chinese privet, a flowering plant species
Orthogonius lucidus, a species of ground beetle
Phalacrocorax lucidus or white-breasted cormorant, a bird species
Polyergus lucidus, a species of ant
Proserpinus lucidus, a species of moth
Siphocampylus lucidus, a plant species

See also
 Technology
Lucida, a family of typefaces developed in 1985
Lucida (intelligent assistant), software that uses natural language processing and machine vision to behave as a personal assistant
 Anatomy
Septum lucidum or septum pellucidum, a thin structure separating two fluid pockets in the brain
Stratum lucidum, a layer of skin
Tapetum lucidum, a layer of tissue in the eye
 Insects
Apatema lucidum, a moth
Hexoplon lucidum, a species of beetle in the family Cerambycidae
Lucida (skipper), a genus of skipper butterflies
Metaphrenon lucidum, a species of beetle in the family Cerambycidae
Nosopon lucidum, a species of lice in the family Menoponidae
 Snails
Conasprella lucida, a predatory sea snail
Drepanotrema lucidum, a freshwater snail
Helix lucida, a synonym for Oxychilus draparnaudi, a land snail
Oxychilus lucidum, a synonym for Oxychilus draparnaudi
Vexillum lucidum, a sea snail
 Other fauna
Hieracium lucidum, a perennial herb of the genus Hieracium
 Flora
Angelica lucida or seacoast angelica, a species in the celery family
Archidendron lucidum, a tree species in the family Fabaceae
Asplenium adiantum-nigrum or black spleenwort, a common species of fern
Asplenium lucidum, a synonym for Asplenium adiantum-nigrum
Bulbophyllum lucidum, a species of orchid in the genus Bulbophyllum
Caucalis lucida, a synonym for Angelica lucida
Coelopleurum lucidum, a synonym for Angelica lucida
Dasylirion lucidum, a plant in the family Asparagaceae
Galium lucidum, a species of plants in the family Rubiaceae
Ganoderma lucidum, the lingzhi mushroom
Gelsemium lucidum, a synonym for Gelsemium sempervirens
Geranium lucidum, or shining cranesbill, a species of the genus Geranium
Huntleya lucida, a species of orchid in the genus Huntleya
Imperatoria lucida, a synonym for Angelica lucida
Lacistema lucidum, a species of small tree in the family Lacistemataceae
Ligustrum lucidum, the wax-leaf privet
Molongum lucidum,  a genus of plant in the family Apocynaceae (genus Molongum )
Orthophytum lucidum, a species in the genus Orthophytum
Ribes lucidum, a synonym for Ribes alpinum
Sedum lucidum, a species of plant in the family Crassulaceae
Vaccinium lucidum, a shrub of the subgenus Vaccinium
Zygopetalum lucidum, a synonym for Huntleya lucida